M. A. Matin is a Bangladesh Nationalist Party politician, Physician and the former member of Parliament for Pabna-2 constituency in 1979.

Career 
M. A. Matin was elected to parliament from Pabna-2 as a Bangladesh Nationalist Party candidate in 1979 Bangladeshi general election.

References 

Living people
Year of birth missing (living people)
People from Sujanagar Upazila
Bangladesh Nationalist Party politicians
2nd Jatiya Sangsad members